Effi Briest is an 1894 German novel by Theodor Fontane

It may also refer to the following films based on the novel:

 Effi Briest (1971 film), East German film directed by Wolfgang Luderer
 Effi Briest (1974 film), West German film directed by Rainer Werner Fassbinder
 Effi Briest (2009 film), German film